Teen Abomination is a fictional character appearing in American comic books published by Marvel Comics. He is a teenage counterpart of the Abomination and the son of Happy Hogan.

Publication history

Teen Abomination first appeared in Superior Iron Man #1 and was created by Tom Taylor and Yıldıray Çınar.

Fictional character biography
Jamie Carlson is the son of a Stark Industries scientist named Katrina Carlson. One day when he was five years old, Jamie Carlson got sick and Katrina brought him to her job at Stark Industries as she couldn't find someone to watch Jamie while she was away. This happened on the same day of the demonstration of a gamma-powered equipment. When the test of the gamma-powered equipment happened, the device suffered a malfunction and exploded. The accident led Katrina to be fired by Tony Stark. Unbeknown to anybody, Jamie had been exposed to the gamma radiation. When he was thirteen, Jamie was bullied by other teenagers where they broke his skateboard. He returned to his house and his mother tried to console him. However, Katrina's attempts frustrated Jamie even more and he transformed into an Abomination-like creature. The physical damage to the house he caused after transforming resulted in an explosion which killed Katrina.

During the AXIS storyline, Iron Man (whose personality had been inverted by an inversion spell used on Red Skull's Red Onslaught form) and She-Hulk fought Teen Abomination when he went on a rampage in San Francisco. He was defeated by Iron Man and She-Hulk.

Teen Abomination was imprisoned, but later broke free and went to Stark Island to fight Iron Man again. Iron Man confronted him where Teen Abomination demanded Stark to listen to him. After being asked what did he want, Teen Abomination replied that he had tried Extremis, but it didn't work on him and wanted Iron Man to help him. Iron Man stated that he could use him.

Jamie started living in Stark Island in secrecy from everyone else where Stark would investigate his condition.

As Iron Man experimented on Jamie, he told him his life story. The results of Tony Stark's investigation led to the discovery that Jamie's father had been Tony's former employee Happy Hogan.

When Pepper Potts and the Tony Stark A.I. tried to help the inverted Tony Stark return to his regular self, they took Teen Abomination in their custody. When Iron Man confronted Pepper and the Tony Stark A.I. at Resilient's New York HQ, Teen Abomination sided with Pepper Potts. Iron Man revealed to Teen Abomination that he had recently discovered that Katrina Carlson was not dead, but had suffered a severe head trauma and was recovering at a hospital. This caused Teen Abomination to transform back to Jamie Carlson.

At some point, Teen Abomination was abducted by an unidentified organization that fused an electronic chip into his skull that controlled him to be a mindless machine for destruction. They started by having Teen Abomination attack Oakland Airport. He was confronted by S.T.A.K.E. operatives Martin Reyna, Jasper Sitwell's zombie form, and the advanced Life Model Decoy of Dum Dum Dugan. Dugan detected the chip in Teen Abomination's skull and commanded Sitwell to shoot a bullet that penetrated Jamie's skull enough to destroy it. S.T.A.K.E. later took him in to help him recover. It was also revealed during this time that his mother is still recovering where she is relearning how to speak amongst other things that need to be relearned.

As part of the All-New, All-Different Marvel event, Teen Abomination appeared as a member of S.T.A.K.E.'s Howling Commandos.

Teen Abomination was with the Howling Commandos at the time when the worked with Old Man Logan to rescue Jubilee from Dracula. He was later unwillingly recruited by Cassandra Nova to her cause. With no self control, Jamie was sent to smash Atlantis, however the Red team was able to subdue him and deactivate the Sentinite which Cassandra had implanted in Jamie's brain to turn him into mutant-hating machine.

Powers and abilities
Teen Abomination has all the powers of Emil Blonsky, but to a lesser extent.

References

Characters created by Tom Taylor (writer)
Comics characters introduced in 2014
Howling Commandos
Fictional characters with superhuman durability or invulnerability
Marvel Comics characters who can move at superhuman speeds
Marvel Comics characters with accelerated healing
Marvel Comics characters with superhuman strength
Marvel Comics mutates
Marvel Comics superheroes
Marvel Comics supervillains
Marvel Comics child superheroes
Teenage superheroes